Eyvani (also Romanized as Eyvānī; also known as Ḩabvānī, Haiwāni, and Ḩeyvānī) is a village in Qaedrahmat Rural District, Zagheh District, Khorramabad County, Lorestan Province, Iran. At the 2006 census, its population was 164, in 31 families.

References 

Towns and villages in Khorramabad County